The Rock City Guards were a militia battalion raised in Nashville, Tennessee in 1860 in anticipation of the American Civil War. 327 men joined the organization; among them were George Maney, who served as captain; lawyer Thomas H. Malone, who served as lieutenant; and Charles Todd Quintard, who served as chaplain. In May 1861 the unit, now consisting of three companies, was mustered into Confederate service as part of the 1st Tennessee Infantry Regiment; George Maney becoming Colonel. The regiment served during the whole American Civil War.

A battle flag used by the Rock City Guards is at the Tennessee State Museum.

References

See also
1st Tennessee Infantry Regiment
List of Tennessee Confederate Civil War units

Military history of the American Civil War
History of Nashville, Tennessee
1860 establishments in Tennessee
1865 disestablishments in Tennessee
Units and formations of the Confederate States Army from Tennessee
Military units and formations disestablished in 1865
Military units and formations established in 1860